Santa Rosa de Lima (the name of Rose of Lima, the first American Roman Catholic saint) could refer to:

Santa Rosa de Lima, Santa Catarina, Brazil
Santa Rosa de Lima, Sergipe, Brazil
Santa Rosa de Lima, La Unión, El Salvador
Santa Rosa de Lima, Santa Rosa, Guatemala
Santa Rosa de Lima (Villagrán), Guanajuato, Mexico
Santa Rosa de Lima, New Mexico, USA, ruins near Abiquiu

See also
Santa Rosa (disambiguation)
Saint Rose (disambiguation)